Luis Gómez (born 18 December 1992) is a Panamanian tennis player.

Gómez makes appearances at the Visit Panamá Cup.

Gómez represents Panama at the Davis Cup where he has a singles W/L record of 2–3, and a doubles W/L of 4–8. The Group III Americas event took place 17 to 22 June 2019 at the Escazu Country Club in Costa Rica on hard court, and Gómez participated in both singles and doubles. The Panama team beat the Honduras, Bermuda, and Trinidad & Tobago teams 2–1 but lost to the Jamaica and Cuba teams 1–2.

References

External links

1992 births
Living people
Sportspeople from Panama City
Panamanian male tennis players
20th-century Panamanian people
21st-century Panamanian people